Heinzia is an extinct ammonoid cephalopod genus belonging to the family Pulchelliidae. They lived during the Cretaceous, in the Barremian age.

Distribution
Fossils of species within this genus have been found in the Cretaceous sediments of Colombia, France, Italy, Morocco and Spain.

References

 Crioceratites
 Jean Vermeulen  Origine, classification et évolution des Pulchellinae (Douville) 1911 emend. Vermeulen 1995 (Pulchelliidae, Endemoceratoidea)
 C. W. Wright, J. H. Calloman and M. K. Howarth, 1996 Treatise on invertebrate paleontology, volume 4 : cretaceous ammonoidea
 Vermeulen, Jean., 1995: A new division in three parts of the Pulchelliidae family Ammonoidea Riviera Scientifique, 65-80

Ammonitida genera
Endemoceratoidea
Cretaceous ammonites
Ammonites of Europe
Paja Formation